The canton of Saint-Quentin-3 (before 2015: Saint-Quentin-Sud) is an administrative division in northern France. It consists of the southern part of the town of Saint-Quentin and its southern suburbs. At the French canton reorganisation which came into effect in March 2015, the canton was expanded from 6 to 9 communes:
Castres
Contescourt
Gauchy  
Grugies
Harly
Homblières
Mesnil-Saint-Laurent
Neuville-Saint-Amand
Saint-Quentin (partly)

Demographics

See also
Cantons of the Aisne department 
Communes of France

References

Cantons of Aisne